Bellaguntha is a town and a Notified Area Council (N.A.C.) in Odisha, India which was the main market of South Odisha in the time of British India. Bellaguntha is also known as Brass Fish Town.

Demographics 

As of the 2011 Census of India, Bellaguntha had a population of 11297. Males constitute 49% of the population and females 51%. Bellaguntha has an average literacy rate of 67%, higher than the national average of 59.5%; with 55% of the males and 45% of females literate. 13% of the population is under 6 years of age.

History
Nrusinghanatha temple attracts thousands of pilgrims to get a darshan of Lakshmi Nrusingh. The temple was established in the 18th century under the Bhanja Dynasty.

Bellaguntha was a local market town for Boudh and Phulbani. Local crafts include brass, silver, copper, and woodwork. There are more than twenty temples in the town.

Geography

Culture
Major local festivals include Thakurani Yatra, Ratha Yatra and Danda Jatra.

Other festivals include Dol Purnima, Durga Puja (Dussehra), Kumar Purnima, Pana Sankranti, Nurshingha Chaturthi, Ram Navami, Janmashtami, Makara Sankranti, Ganesh Puja and Saraswati Puja.

Food
Some sweets are prepared for special festivals, such as Halua and Drakhya for Ratha Yatra and Satapuri for Satapuri Amabasya.

Transport
By Road: Bellaguntha is connected with State Highway 21 (Odisha) and State Highway 30 (Odisha) which connect to other cities and towns of Odisha.

By Rail: Brahmapur railway station is the nearest railway station which is about 80 km from Bellaguntha.

By Air: Biju Patnaik International Airport is about 160 km from the town.

Local sites

 Sri LaxmiNrusingh Temple - an old temple of Odisha
 Sri Jagannath Temple - Dadhibaman temple
 Sri Balunkeswara Temple - a temple made of red rocks on the bank of a large pond
 Maa Bramhanadevi Temple - temple in a bamboo forest
 Sri Baidyanath Temple - a temple at Nayakpada a few kilometres away from the town
 Anikata is near Jirol Village. There is a dam at the confluence of the Loharakhandi and Bada rivers, its main purpose was irrigation and flood protection
 Sagar - ten fishery ponds excavated by Bhanja kings
 Kumarsuni Hills 
 Sri Chandra Kalpeswar temple at Sasan Street.
 Lachhaman Balaji temple - an old math of monks
 Sri Bhagabat Temple Chasa Sahi
 Biju Pattnaik children's Park

Climate and regional setting
Maximum summer temperature is 37 °C; minimum winter temperature is 14 °C. The mean daily temperature varies from 33 °C to 38 °C. May is the hottest month; December is the coldest. The average annual rainfall is 1250 mm and the region receives monsoon and torrential rainfall from July to October.

Education 
Educational institutions include:
 Bellaguntha Junior Science College
 Bellaguntha Women's College
 Sai Industrial Training Institute (ITI)
 G.T. High School, Estd: 1948
 Girls' High School
 Saraswati Sishu Bidya Bhawan
 Swami Vivekananda Sisu Bidya Mandir
 Swami Vivekananda Play School
 Smile Play School
 Saraswati Sisu Bidya Manadir
 Sri Arabinda Purnanga Sikhya Kendra
 Balidi U.P School
 Mala sahi Prathamika Bidyalaya 
 Patel Road U.P School
 Bhagabata Patana UP School
 Rangani Patana Prathamika Bidyalaya
 M.E School
 Takshila English Medium School
 Odisha Public School
 Kautilya Smart Learning School (English Medium Smart School)

References

Cities and towns in Ganjam district